Brachinus elegans is a species of ground beetle in the Brachininae subfamily that can be found in Bulgaria, Albania, Austria, Czech Republic, France, Greece, Hungary, Italy, Moldova, Romania, Slovakia, Ukraine, all states of former Yugoslavia (except for North Macedonia), in Western Europe, and on the islands such as Sardinia and Sicily. Besides European countries it can be found in Armenia, Iran, Iraq, Kazakhstan and Turkey. It can also be found in North African country of Morocco. The species were also found in Georgia in 2004.

References

Beetles described in 1842
Beetles of North Africa
Beetles of Asia
Beetles of Europe
Brachininae